The 2012 Eastern Michigan Eagles football team represented Eastern Michigan University in the 2012 NCAA Division I FBS football season. They were led by fourth year head coach Ron English and played their home games at Rynearson Stadium. They are a member of the West Division of the Mid-American Conference. They finished the season 2–10, 1–7 in MAC play to finish in last place in the West Division.

Schedule

Source: Schedule

Game summaries

@ Ball State

Illinois State

@ Purdue

@ Michigan State

Kent State

Toledo

Army

@ Bowling Green

@ Ohio

Central Michigan

@ Western Michigan

Northern Illinois

References

Eastern Michigan
Eastern Michigan Eagles football seasons
Eastern Michigan Eagles football